Mário Delgado may refer to:
 Mário Delgado (equestrian), Portuguese equestrian.
 Mario Martín Delgado, Mexican politician
 Mars (rapper) (Mario Delgado), American rapper and record producer